Labiatophysa is a subgenus of stone loach genus Triplophysa native to central Asia. It is regarded by some authorities as a valid genus in its own right.

Species
There are currently three recognized species in this genus:
 Triplophysa (Labiatophysa) herzensteini (L. S. Berg, 1909)
 Triplophysa (Labiatophysa) microphthalma (Kessler, 1879)
 Triplophysa (Labiatophysa) nasalis (Kessler, 1876) (incertae sedis but probably belongs in this subgenus)

References

Nemacheilidae
Animal subgenera